Lewis H. Walter (December 14, 1905 – September 29, 1982) was an American sports journalist. A columnist for Detroit Times and Detroit Free Press, he won the Elmer Ferguson Memorial Award in 1984 and is a member of the media section of the Hockey Hall of Fame. He covered the Detroit Red Wings. Walter attended the University of Michigan and graduated in 1929. He died in 1982.

References

1905 births
1982 deaths
American sportswriters
Elmer Ferguson Award winners
University of Michigan alumni